Namastey London is a 2007 Indian romance film, directed and produced by Vipul Amrutlal Shah, starring 
Akshay Kumar and Katrina Kaif in lead roles. It also stars Rishi Kapoor, Nina Wadia, Javed Sheikh, Upen Patel and Clive Standen in supporting roles. The film is originally based on the real life story of Kumar's friend. Riteish Deshmukh appears in a cameo role in the film. 

"Namastey London" was released on March 23, 2007, and it received positive reviews for its direction, screenplay, and soundtrack, particularly Akshay Kumar's performance, which was highly acclaimed. It was also a box office success, earning 71.40 crore worldwide, thus becoming the ninth-highest grossing Hindi film of 2007. The success of the film ended a long dry spell of box office failures since the release of Salaam-e-Ishq: A Tribute to Love which was released on January 2007.

At the 53rd Filmfare Awards, Namastey London received 1 nomination – Best Actor (Kumar).

Several critics noted similarities between the film and Manoj Kumar's Purab Aur Paschim (1970), though the director denied it being a remake.

Plot
Indian-born Manmohan Malhotra (Rishi Kapoor) re-located to London, England, established himself, returned to India, married Bebo (Nina Wadia), and after four years got a visa for her so that she could live with him. Shortly thereafter, she gave birth to Jasmeet (Katrina Kaif). Manmohan was always embarrassed by Bebo as she was overweight and could not speak English. As a result, he always left her out of important occasions, while he socialised. Bebo did not want Jasmeet to end up like her, so she got her educated in an English school, encouraged her to mingle with British friends, and Jasmeet was transformed into Jazz – a beautiful young woman, modern in looks, talk, habits, and heart.

Her father had set her to meet a young lad, Bobby Bedi (Ritesh Deshmukh), though the date turns out to be a disaster and Bobby rejects her. Manmohan thinks that it is impossible to get him an Indian son-in-law, although his British Pakistani friend, Parvez Khan (Javed Sheikh), is in a similar situation with his son, Imran (Upen Patel), who has an Indophobic girlfriend, Susan (Cathy Barry). Manmohan takes his family for a tour in India and forces Jasmeet to marry Arjun Singh (Akshay Kumar) who does not know how to speak English.

On their return to London, Jasmeet announces that she will marry an English man named Charlie Brown (Clive Standen), who is well educated and has good friends and connections, even with Prince Charles. She refuses to recognise her marriage to Arjun as there is no legal proof of the wedding. When Jasmeet is introduced to the friends of the Brown family, she is subjected to considerable abuse (Eve teasings, Indian rope tricks, Jai Shri Ram) as well as a quote from Winston Churchill: 'When we leave India, the country will be in the hands of goons'. Arjun then tells the gentleman about the achievements of India which includes about the derivation of English words from Sanskrit like 'Mother', 'Brother' , 'Trignometry' and 'Geometry'. During this period, Jazz becomes close with Arjun who still supports her. Charlie Brown then has a rugby match against the Indians/Pakistanis and Arjun, with the Desis emerging triumphant and Brown is verbally abusive towards them. Imran is then asked by Susan's parents to leave Islam, become a Christian, change his name to Emmanuel or Ian, as well as provide written proof that his family is not associated with terrorists. The film ends on a happy note when Imran decides not to be a Christian and Susan is accepted by Imran's family; Jazz realises that Arjun lied to her about not knowing English and runs away from her wedding to Charlie Brown, and goes with Arjun back to India where they are seen riding Arjun's motorcycle. While they are on the motorcycle Arjun reveals that all along he knew how to speak English, and that he had already dropped the clue when he got offended at Charlie's uncle's derogatory comments on India. He adds that he lied because he was still an Indian at heart.

Cast
 Akshay Kumar as Arjun Ballu Singh
 Katrina Kaif as Jasmeet Malhotra Singh (Jazz)
 Rishi Kapoor as Manmohan Malhotra
 Nina Wadia as Bebo Malhotra
 Upen Patel as Imran Khan (Immi)
 Clive Standen as Charles Brown (Charlie)
 Tiffany Mulheron as Susan
 Javed Sheikh as Parvez Khan (Imran's father)
 Riteish Deshmukh as Bobby Bedi (guest appearance)
 Billy Herrington as exotic dancer at hen party (guest appearance)
 Gurpreet Ghuggi as the taxi driver (special appearance)
 Vir Das as prospective groom no. 1
 Kunal Kumar as prospective groom no. 2

Soundtrack

The soundtrack album was released on 27 January 2007 and received good reviews. The songs were composed by Himesh Reshammiya. Salim–Sulaiman composed the film score. All songs were penned by Javed Akhtar.

Release and reception

The film was released on 27th March, 2007 worldwide.

Namastey London received positive reviews from critics upon release. Taran Adarsh of indiafm.com wrote, "Namastey London is addictive stuff. You watch it once, you wanna watch it again." Kumar received almost unanimous praise for his portrayal of Arjun Singh, with a critic saying "Kumar certainly leaves his mark throughout the flick. One of the coolest performances of the star." Adarsh said "One of his finest performances so far, Namastey London also marks the coming of age of an actor who was often dubbed as an action hero or a funster. Kumar not only wins the heart of Kaif on-screen, he's sure to win the hearts of millions of moviegoers with a terrific portrayal in this film." On Katrina Kaif's performance he wrote, "she handles the complex part with remarkable ease. The pretty lass is only getting better with every film." Despite the generally favorable reviews, Prachi Singh of Moviewalah panned the film, with a verdict of 2 out of 5 stars.

Box office

Namastey London opened to a good response and mainly picked up momentum after the second and third day of its release, a major reason being India's exit from the 2007 Cricket World Cup. The film did extremely well in the northern parts of India, especially in Punjab, Haryana, Rajasthan, and Uttar Pradesh. It also did well in Mumbai and in the first week of its release collected . The film was also received well in other parts of the country. The success of the film ended a long spell of box office failures since the release of Salaam-e-Ishq: A Tribute to Love which released on January 2007. The film went on to gross  worldwide, making it one of the top hits of 2007.

The film was also successful overseas. It debuted at number 9 on the UK charts and similarly debuted within the top 20 in the United States and Australian charts. The film collected £238,841 in the first week of its release. As of 27 July 2007, the movie grossed an estimated $15,273,747 in five territories, which included the United States ($4,149,772), Australia ($197,148), India ($17,267,662), Malaysia ($15,285), and the United Kingdom ($9,021,900).

Remake and sequel
The film was unofficially remade in Bengali as Paran Jai Jaliya Re starring Dev and Subhashree Ganguly. The Kolkata High Court in December 2009 banned the screening of the film for plagiarism after a petition was filed by the film's producers.

In March 2011, Shah had announced a sequel, Namaste England. Kumar and Sonakshi Sinha were initially signed to play the leads in the sequel. Namaste England was released in October 2018 with Parineeti Chopra and Arjun Kapoor starring.

References

External links

 
 
 

2007 films
2000s Hindi-language films
2007 romantic comedy-drama films
Films scored by Himesh Reshammiya
Films shot in London
Films shot in Punjab, India
Films set in London
Films set in Punjab, India
Indian romantic comedy-drama films
Hindi films remade in other languages
Films directed by Vipul Amrutlal Shah
2007 comedy films
2007 drama films